Queen Anne pistols are a type of breech-loading flintlock pistol known as a turn-off pistol, in which the chamber is filled from the front and accessed by unscrewing the barrel.  Another distinguishing feature of the design is that the lock-plate and the breech section (chamber) of the firearm are forged as a single piece. Possibly first made in England, they came in fashion in England during the reign of Queen Anne (reigned 1702–1714) and are consequently so named.  This type of pistol is noted for being made small, so that it could be easily carried and concealed.  Carbines of this design are also documented.

Design 
Queen Anne pistols are flintlock pistols with three defining characteristics. They have a turn-off barrel, typically with a swelled cannon muzzle, and are chamber-loaded. The body of the pistol (the breech) and the lock-plate are forged as a single piece. The frizzen spring is located to the rear of the frizzen rather than the conventional position, in front of it.  To the last of these, this is a functional modification, such that the springs location does not obstruct removal of the barrel for loading. The lock-plate is integral with the body, and is sometimes described as a boxlock in consequence. It is nonetheless offset to one side with the mechanism assembled either side of the plate and is otherwise a conventional sidelock design. This is substantially different from the usual use of the term associated with Anson and Deeley patented shotgun design, where the firing mechanism is mounted within the frame of the firearm rather than off the sides of a lock-plate.

Queen Anne pistols are typically rifled. To load, the barrel unscrews (with the aid of a spanner) just in advance of the chamber recess, that is filled with powder. The ball is placed in a conical seat (cup) at the end of the chamber before replacing the barrel. The breech end of the barrel is slightly enlarged to accept the ball.  Upon firing, the ball fills the grooves of the rifling to create an effective seal.

The design was particularly suited to producing a small pistol that could be easily carried and concealed. They may be referred to as an overcoat pistol, a toby or a muff pistol. Queen Anne pistols usually exhibit a high level of decorative finish and workmanship.

Notes

Further reading 

 Pirate Living History 1680–1725
 Burgoyne, John W., The Queen Anne Pistol.  Museum Restoration Service, 2002 
 Boothroyd, Geoffrey, The Handgun, Crown Publishers 1970
 Garrett, Richard, The Evolution of the Queen Anne Pistol. Catalogue of the London Park Lane Arms Fair, Spring 2005

Single-shot pistols
Early firearms
Black-powder pistols
Pistols of the United Kingdom
Anne, Queen of Great Britain